Le Grand Larance Prix is the sixth studio album by Shit and Shine, released in January 2011 by Riot Season.

Track listing

Personnel
Adapted from the Le Grand Larance Prix liner notes.
Shit and Shine
 Craig Clouse – vocals, instruments
Production and additional personnel
 Andrew Smith – cover art

Release history

References

External links 
 
 Le Grand Larance Prix at Bandcamp

2011 albums
Shit and Shine albums